Eucanthus is a genus of earth-boring scarab beetles in the family Bolboceratidae. There are about eight described species in Eucanthus.

Species
These eight species belong to the genus Eucanthus:
 Eucanthus alutaceus Cartwright, 1944
 Eucanthus bonariensis (Klug, 1843)
 Eucanthus felschei Boucomont, 1910
 Eucanthus greeni Robinson, 1948
 Eucanthus impressus Howden, 1964
 Eucanthus lazarus (Fabricius, 1775)
 Eucanthus mexicanus Howden, 1964
 Eucanthus subtropicus HOWDEN, 1955

References

Further reading

External links

 

Bolboceratidae
Articles created by Qbugbot